Memória de Helena is a 1969 Brazilian drama film directed by David Neves, based on the novel My Girl Life by Helena Morley.

Cast 
Rosa Maria Penna as Helena
Adriana Prieto		
Arduíno Colassanti		
Joel Barcellos as Andre
Humberto Mauro		
Olga Danitch		
Áurea Campos		
Neila Tavares		
Mair Tavares

Awards 
1969: Brasília Film Festival
Best Film (won)
Best Director (David Neves) (won) 
Best Cinematography (David Drew Zingg) (won)

References

External links 
 

1969 films
1960s Portuguese-language films
Brazilian drama films
1969 drama films